Oplosia is a genus of beetle in the family Cerambycidae, containing the following species:

 Oplosia cinerea (Mulsant, 1839)
 Oplosia nubila (LeConte, 1862)
 Oplosia suvorovi Pic, 1914

References

Oreodera